W. D. Weerasingha (born 15 April 1979) is a Sri Lankan politician, former provincial councillor and Member of Parliament.

Weerasingha was born on 15 April 1979. He contested the 2012 provincial council election as one of the United People's Freedom Alliance (UPFA) electoral alliance's candidates in Ampara District and was elected to the Eastern Provincial Council (EPC). He resigned from the Sri Lanka Freedom Party in September 2017 to support former President Mahinda Rajapaksa.

In January 2020 Weerasingha and Wimalaweera Dissanayake were accused of leading a mob that attacked Mahajana Eksath Peramuna member Rushan Milinda. Weerasingha contested the 2020 parliamentary election as a Sri Lanka People's Freedom Alliance (SLPFA) electoral alliance candidate in Ampara District and was elected to the Parliament of Sri Lanka.

References

1979 births
Living people
Members of the 16th Parliament of Sri Lanka
Members of the Eastern Provincial Council
Sinhalese politicians
Sri Lanka Freedom Party politicians
Sri Lankan Buddhists
Sri Lanka People's Freedom Alliance politicians
Sri Lanka Podujana Peramuna politicians
United People's Freedom Alliance politicians